Code page 1133 (CCSID 1133) is a code page created by IBM for representation of Lao script.

Code page layout

Only the upper half of the table (80–FF) is shown, the lower half (00–7F) being the same as ASCII.

References

1133